This is a list of airports in Senegal, sorted by location.



Airports 

Airport names shown in bold indicate the airport has scheduled commercial airline service.

See also 
 Transport in Senegal
 List of airports by ICAO code: G#GO - Senegal
 Wikipedia: WikiProject Aviation/Airline destination lists: Africa#Senegal

References
 
  - includes IATA codes
 World Aero Data: Senegal - ICAO codes, coordinates
 Great Circle Mapper: Senegal - IATA and ICAO codes, coordinates

Footnotes

Senegal
 
Airports
Airports
Senegal